The 1st Tennessee Cavalry Regiment was a cavalry regiment that served in the Union Army during the American Civil War. It was also known as 1st East Tennessee Cavalry.

Service
The 1st Tennessee Cavalry was organized in November 1862 at Camp Dennison, Ohio from the 4th Tennessee Infantry, and mustered in for a three-year enlistment under the command of Colonel Robert Johnson.

The regiment was attached to Camp Dennison, Ohio, to December 1862. Reserve Brigade, Cavalry Division, Army of the Cumberland, to January 1863. 1st Brigade, 1st Cavalry Division, Army of the Cumberland, to November 1864. 1st Brigade, 1st Division, Cavalry Corps, Military Division Mississippi, to January 1865. District Middle Tennessee, Department of the Cumberland, to June 1865.

The 1st Tennessee Cavalry mustered out of service at Nashville, Tennessee during April and June 1865.

Casualties
The regiment lost a total of 356 men during service; 4 officers and 56 enlisted men were killed or mortally wounded, 3 officers and 293 enlisted men died of disease or accident.

Commanders
 Colonel Robert Johnson
 Colonel James P. Brownlow - commanded at the battle of Chickamauga as lieutenant colonel
 Lieutenant Colonel Calvin M. Dyer - commanded at the Battle of Nashville

See also

 List of Tennessee Civil War units
 Tennessee in the Civil War

References

 Carter, W. R. History of the First Regiment of Tennessee Volunteer Cavalry in the Great War of the Rebellion, With the Armies of the Ohio and Cumberland, under Generals Morgan, Rosecrans, Thomas, Stanley and Wilson, 1862-1865 (Knoxville, TN:  Gaut-Ogden Co., Printers), 1902.
 Dyer, Frederick H.  A Compendium of the War of the Rebellion (Des Moines, IA:  Dyer Pub. Co.), 1908.
 Wiefering, Edna. Tennessee Union Soldiers Vol. 1 (Cleveland, TN:  Cleveland Public Library), 1996.
Attribution

External links
 1st Tennessee Cavalry living history organization
 Brief unit history, including officers' names, regimental strengths, etc.

Military units and formations established in 1862
Military units and formations disestablished in 1865
Units and formations of the Union Army from Tennessee
1865 disestablishments in Tennessee
1862 establishments in Ohio